Bella Terra is an outdoor shopping mall in Huntington Beach, California. It was built on the site of the former Huntington Center. The center's current anchors are; Kohl's, Burlington Coat Factory, Barnes & Noble, Cinemark Theaters, Whole Foods Market, and Costco Wholesale.

History

Huntington Center opening

The Huntington Center was the first enclosed, all-weather mall in Orange County.

Department store anchored the center:
The Broadway 2 stories,  on a  lot, Charles Luckman and Associates, architects
JCPenney 2 stories,  plus a  auto service center  
Montgomery Ward 2 stories,  plus a  auto service center on a  lot
Barker Brothers a 2 story furniture store (built with the same architectural style as The Broadway) across the parking lot and an unenclosed strip of several shops adjacent.

Additional tenants at opening included Lerner's, Judy's, Harris & Frank, Leed's, Kinney Shoes, Thom McAn, Security First National Bank, Crocker-Citizens National Bank Food Fair supermarket and Thrifty Drug Stores.

An eight-ton statue from Budapest, Hungary was installed in the center of the mall.

Later developments
 1986: New wing was built with Mervyn's added as its fourth anchor store and a new food court added and all opened in November.
 1993: JCPenney closed in November and relocated to Westminster Mall.
 1995: Burlington Coat Factory replaced JCPenney. Barnes & Noble opened in October, moving into the long-vacant former Barker Bros. building.
 1996: The Broadway closed in August due to the company being purchased by Macy's and liquidated and the wing between the closed The Broadway building and Burlington Coat Factory was closed and sealed off shortly thereafter as the mall's business begins to decline rapidly.

Closedown
 2000: Burlington Coat Factory sued mall owners, claiming they are being "forced out" during the mall's redevelopment.
 2001: Montgomery Ward closed in March due to liquidation making it the last original anchor store to close.
 2003: Mall closed, except for Mervyn's and Burlington Coat Factory, which closed shortly after the mall closed. The mall was demolished soon afterward, except for Burlington Coat Factory, Mervyn's and the empty Montgomery Ward and The Broadway.

Rebirth as Bella Terra
 2006: Bella Terra opened with Kohl's in the old The Broadway building. The empty Montgomery Ward building was left standing and was demolished in 2010.
 2008: Mervyn's and Circuit City closed, Mervyn's due to liquidation and Circuit City due to bankruptcy.
 2010: The vacant Montgomery Ward and Mervyn's buildings were demolished.  Whole Foods Market replaces former Circuit City.
 2012: Costco opened in May.
 2013: The Residences at Bella Terra, a 467-unit apartment complex with retail space on the ground level, opened on the site of the former Montgomery Ward.

References

External links

  of Bella Terra
 DJM Capital Partners, Inc. (mall owners and managers)

Shopping malls in Orange County, California
Shopping malls established in 2006
Art Deco architecture in California